The Marine Adder class of transports were Type C4-class ship built for the United States Maritime Commission (MARCOM) during World War II. They were converted after the war for use by the United States Navy (USN) for troop transports. Marine Adder-class ships also served in the Korean War..

Marine Adder-class transport

References

Bibliography
 American Merchant Marine at War - C4 ships
 US Maritime Commission Details and Outboard Profiles of Maritime Commission Vessels, The C4 Cargo Ship, Conversions and Subdesigns
 US Maritime Commission overview
 US Maritime Commission - Technical Specifications for Ships including definitions of terms
 From America to United States: The History of the long-range Merchant Shipbuilding Programme of the United States Maritime Commission, by L.A. Sawyer and W.H. Mitchell. London, 1981, World Ship Society
 Ships for Victory: A History of Shipbuilding under the U.S. Maritime Commission in World War II, by Frederic C. Lane 

 
Troop ships